Wright High School may refer to:

 C. Milton Wright High School, Bel Air, Maryland
 J. M. Wright Technical High School, Stamford, Connecticut
 Murray-Wright High School, Detroit, Michigan
 Philemon Wright High School, Gatineau, Quebec
 Sophie B. Wright Charter School, also known as Wright High School, New Orleans, Louisiana
 Wright City High School, Wright City, Missouri